Skúli Helgason (born 15 April 1965) was a member of parliament of the Althing, the Icelandic parliament. He is a member of the Social Democratic Alliance.

External links
Althing biography

Living people
1965 births
Skuli Helgason
Skuli Helgason
Place of birth missing (living people)
University of Minnesota alumni
21st-century Icelandic politicians